Nilus may refer to:

Nilus (mythology), a Greek god, a son of Oceanus and Tethys, the god of the Nile River
Nile, the river, known as Nilus in Latin
Saint Nilus (disambiguation), multiple people
Nilus Cabasilas (14th century), bishop of Thessalonika
Nilus of Sora (c. 1433–1508), Russian saint and Orthodox theologian, founder of non-posessors movement
Sergei Nilus (1862–1929), Russian religious writer, self-described mystic, publisher of The Protocols of the Elders of Zion
Pyotr Nilus (1869–1943), Russian painter and writer
Nilus the Sandman, main character of the eponymous children's television show Nilus the Sandman (1996–1998) and its three precursor TV specials (airing in 1991, 1994, and 1995)
Nilus the Sandman: The Boy Who Dreamed Christmas, a 1991 Christmas TV special featuring the character Nilus the Sandman in his first appearance
Nilus (comics), an Italian comic strip
Nilus (spider), a spider genus